Signature Theatre is a Tony Award winning regional theater company based in Arlington, Virginia.

Overview
Founded in 1989, Signature Theatre is known for its productions of contemporary musicals and plays, reinventions of classic musicals, and development of new work. Under the leadership of Co-Founder and former Artistic Director Eric D. Schaeffer and Managing Director Maggie Boland, the company has staged 59 world premiere productions, including 19 new musical commissions. Signature is home to the single largest musical theater commissioning project in the United States, The American Musical Voices Project.

Cameron Mackintosh, Terrence McNally, James Lapine, John Kander, and Fred Ebb are among those that have presented works here. Since 1991, Signature has had a long relationship with Stephen Sondheim, producing 30 of his musicals, revues and concerts—more than any other professional theater in the country.

The theatre established a Sondheim Award "as a tribute to America's most influential contemporary musical theatre composer". The first award, to Stephen Sondheim, was presented at an April 27, 2009 benefit with performances by Bernadette Peters, Michael Cerveris, Will Gartshore and Eleasha Gamble. The 2020 awardee is Carol Burnett. Recent awardees include Cameron Mackintosh (2017), John Kander (2018), and Audra McDonald (2019).

History 
In 1989, in response to DC's theater scene that was dominated by large venues that presented mostly traditional plays and the desire to create a “signature” brand of provocative works, graphic designer and performer Eric Schaeffer founded Signature Theatre with actor Donna Migliaccio. Signature first began in Arlington county's Gunston Middle School auditorium, and in 1991 Signature presented their first production of a musical, Sweeney Todd, a stand-out hit, that put Signature on the map, earned four Helen Hayes Awards and solidified Signature's (and Eric Schaeffer's) reputation as an intrepid producer of Stephen Sondheim's work.

In 1993, Signature Theatre converted a defunct auto garage into a blackbox theater, and remained there for the following thirteen years. While in the “garage,” Signature grew into one of the Washington area's leading producers of musical theater.

In January 2007, Signature completed a $16 million capital campaign for a dramatic new two-theater facility that tripled its former garage space and now serves as the cultural anchor of Arlington's Village at Shirlington.

On June 7, 2009, Signature received theater's highest artistic honor – the 2009 Regional Theatre Tony Award® – in recognition of artistic excellence.

Today, attracting talent from the DC metropolitan region and New York, Signature has grown to reach more than 100,000 people annually from the Washington, DC region and beyond and garners praise from local and national press including The Washington Post, The New York Times, Entertainment Weekly, The Wall Street Journal, BroadwayWorld.com, Playbill, Time, Variety, USA Today and American Theatre. Signature has won 107 Helen Hayes Awards for excellence in the Washington, DC region's professional theater and has been honored with 431 nominations.

Eric Schaeffer resigned on June 23, 2020, amidst multiple allegations of sexual harassment and assault.

Facilities

In 1989 Signature Theatre began production in the Arlington County Gunston Arts Center. This original home was in the library of a former middle school which had been converted to a black box theater. They rapidly outgrew this facility and in 1993 acquired a defunct Auto Bumper Plating shop, AKA "The Garage", which they converted into a 136-seat black box. In 2007, however, in partnership with Arlington County, Virginia, Signature moved into a new $16 million theater complex built in The Village at Shirlington. The first floor of the building houses the Shirlington Branch of the Arlington County Public Library. The upper three floors house the theater. The complex has an industrial decor, with exposed particle board, pipes and metal sheeting. It includes two state-of-the-art black box theaters. The larger, christened "Max" in honor of Maxine Isaacs, seats 275 and can expand to accommodate 350 patrons. The smaller "Ark", named in honor of Arlene and Robert Kogod, can hold 99. The theaters are built as "square box within a square box, floating on hockey pucks. At $30 a puck. It is built like a soundstage" In addition to the two performance spaces, the complex contains a lobby, meeting rooms, three rehearsal spaces, four individual dressing rooms, three shared dressing rooms, three showers, a cast greenroom, a separate orchestra greenroom, three kitchen areas, scene, prop, and costume shops. The large lobby was named by donors Gilbert and Jaylee Mead in honor Gilbert's late son Rob Mead.

Notable past productions

Sweeney Todd By Stephen Sondheim and Hugh Wheeler; August 27 – September 21, 1991.
Assassins By Stephen Sondheim and John Weidman; August 20 – October 3, 1992.
The Fix by John Dempsey and Dana P. Rowe; March 17 – May 10, 1998. This production was significant because it began a long-term relationship between the theatre and Cameron Mackintosh
Grand Hotel, By Luther Davis, Robert Wright, George Forrest, Maury Yeston; August 21 – October 7, 2001.
Signature's 2007–2008 Kander and Ebb Celebration, featuring Kiss of the Spider Woman starring Natascia Diaz, Will Chase, and Hunter Foster, then The Happy Time, and finally The Visit which starred Chita Rivera and George Hearn.
Les Misérables by Alain Boublil and Claude-Michel Schönberg. Based on a novel by Victor Hugo; December 2, 2008 – February 22, 2009.
Glory Days by James Gardiner and Nick Blaemire; January 15 – February 17, 2008
Giant by Michael John LaChuisa and Sybille Pearson; April 28 – May 31, 2009
First You Dream- The Music of Kander & Ebb; September 10 – 27, 2009
Chess by Benny Andersson, Björn Ulvaeus, Tim Rice; Aug. 10 – October 3, 2010
Really Really, Paul Downs Colaizzo; January 31 – March 25, 2012
Sunday In The Park With George, by Stephen Sondheim and James Lapine; August. 5 – September 21, 2014 
Diner by Sheryl Crow and Barry Levinson; December 9 – January 25, 2015
West Side Story, by Stephen Sondheim, Arthur Laurents, Leonard Bernstein; December 8 – Jan. 24, 2016
Jelly's Last Jam, by George C. Wolfe, Susan Birkenhead, Jelly Roll Morton, Luther Henderson August 2 – September 11, 2016
Freaky Friday, by Tom Kitt, Brian Yorkey, Bridget Carpenter, October 4 – November 20, 2016
Titanic, by Maury Yeston and Peter Stone December 13 – January 29, 2017
A Little Night Music, by Stephen Sondheim and Hugh Wheeler August 15 – October 8, 2017

Production history

1990–1991 season 

 Millfire, by Sally Nemeth. Directed by Dorothy Newman; October 9–27, 1990
 A Life in the Theatre  by David Mamet. Directed by Robert McNamera; February 12 – March 2, 1991
 Les Liaisons Dangereuses by Christopher Hampton. Directed by Jack Marshall; April 10–27, 1991

1991–1992 season 

 Sweeney Todd, music and lyrics by Stephen Sondheim, book by Hugh Wheeler. Directed by Eric Schaeffer; August 27 – September 21, 1991
 Eagle River, by Paulette Laufer. Directed by Dorothy Newman; January 8 – February 1, 1992
 The Wall of Water, by Sherry Kramer. Directed by Gloria Dugan; April 1–25, 1992
 The Last Meeting of the Knights of the White Magnolia, by Preston Jones. Directed by Donald R. Martin; June 24 – July 18, 1992

1992–1993 season 

 Assassins, music and lyrics by Stephen Sondheim, book by John Weidman. Directed by Eric Schaeffer; August 20 – October 3, 1992
 Unidentified Human Remains and the True Nature of Love, by Brad Fraser. Directed by Dorothy Newman & Eric Schaeffer; February 3–27, 1993
 Our Country's Good, by Timberlake Wertenbaker. Directed by Jerry Manning; April 21 – May 22, 1993

1993–1994 season 

 Company, music and lyrics by Stephen Sondheim, book by George Furth. Directed by Eric Schaeffer; October 19 – November 27, 1993
 Raft of the Medusa, by Joe Pintauro. Directed by Wallace Action; January 11 – March 5, 1994
 Vera, by Roland Reed. Directed by Marcia Gardner; January 18 – March 4, 1994
 Abundance, by Beth Henley. Directed by Dorothy Newman; March 15 – April 23, 1994
Wings – The Musical, book & lyrics by Arthur Perlman, music by Jeffrey Lunden; May 10 – June 18, 1994

1994–1995 season 

 Into The Woods, music and lyrics by Stephen Sondheim, book by James Lapine. Directed by Eric Schaeffer; August 28 – October 23, 1994
 Otabenga, by John Strand. Directed by Michael Kahn; November 16 – December 17, 1994
 Poor Super Man, by Brad Fraser. Directed by Eric Schaeffer; January 17 – February 11, 1995
 First Lady Suite, by Michael John Lachuisa. Directed by Eric Schaeffer; March 14 – April 15, 1995
 Lu Anne Hampton Laverty Oberlander, by Preston Jones. Directed by Donald R. Martin; May 9 – June 10, 1995
 Here to Stay, by Norman Allen. Directed by Normal Allen; May 20 – June 17, 1995

1995–1996 season 

 Cabaret, music by John Kander, lyrics by Fredd Ebb, book by Joe Masteroff. Directed by Eric Schaeffer; August 23 – October 22, 1995
 A Grand Night for Singing, music by Richard Rodgers, lyrics by Oscar Hammerstein. Directed by Karma Camp; November 15 – December 23, 1995
 Taking my Life in Your Hands, by Paulette Laufer. Directed by Eric Schaeffer; January 17 – February 18, 1996
 Four Dogs and a Bone, by John Patrick Shanley. Directed by Dorothy Newman; February 28 – March 31, 1996
 Passion, music and lyrics by Stephen Sondheim, book by James Lapine. Directed by Eric Schaeffer; April 23 – June 30, 1996

1996–1997 season 

 The Rink, music by John Kander, lyrics by Fred Ebb, book by Terrence McNally. Directed by Eric Schaeffer; August 21 – October 6
 Three Nights in Tehran, by John Strand. Directed by Kyle Donnelly; November 15 – December 22, 1996
 No Way to Treat a Lady, by Douglas Cohen. Directed by Scott Schwartz; January 22 – March 2, 1997
 Melville Slept Here, by Norman Allen. Directed by Tom Prewitt; March 28 – May 4, 1997
 Sunday in the Park with George, music and lyrics by Stephen Sondheim, book by James Lapine. Directed by Eric Schaeffer; April 12 – June 15, 1997 (Co-production with arena Stage, Washington, D.C.)

1997–1998 season 

 Never the Sinner, by John Logan. Directed by Ethan McSweeney; August 19 – September 30, 1997
 Working, by Stephen Schwartz & Nina Faso. Directed by Eric Schaeffer; October 28 – December 7, 1997
 Shooting in Madrid, by Tug Yourgrau. Directed by Tom Prewitt; January 6 – February 23, 1998
 The Fix, book and lyrics by John Dempsey, music by Dana Rowe. directed by Eric Schaeffer; March 17 – May 10, 1998
 A Stephen Sondheim Evening – The Music and Lyrics of Stephen Sondheim. Directed by Eric Schaeffer; May 26 – July 5, 1998

1998–1999 season 

 A Little Night Music, music and lyrics by Stephen Sondheim, book by Hugh Wheeler. Directed by Frank Lombardi; August 18 – October 4, 1998
 Nijinsky's Last Dance, by Norman Allen. Directed by Joe Calarco; November 3 – December 13, 1998
 Over & Over, music by John Kander, lyrics by Fred Ebb, book by Joseph Stein. Directed by Eric Schaeffer; January 6 – February 14, 1999
 Tell Me On a Sunday, music by Andrew Lloyd Webber, lyrics by Don Black. Directed by Marcia Gardner; March 16 – April 25, 1999
 Angels in America, Part One: Millenium Approaches, by Tony Kushner. Directed by Lee Mikeska Gardner

1999–2000 season 

 Angels in America, Part Two: Perestroika, by Tony Kushner. Directed by Lee Mikeska Gardner
 Sweeney Todd, music and lyrics by Stephen Sondheim, book by Hugh Wheeler. Directed by Eric Schaeffer; September 7 – November 13, 1999
 Floyd Collins, music and lyrics by Adam Guettel, book by Tina Landau. Directed by Gordon Greenberg; January 4 – February 13, 2000
 Available Light, by Heather McDonald. Directed by Heather McDonald; March 7 – April 16, 2000
 Side Show, music by Henry Kreiger, book and lyrics by Bill Russel. Directed by Joe Calarco; May 9 – June 18, 2000

2000–2001 season 

 The Rhythm Club, music by Matthew Sklar, book and lyrics by Chad Bequelin. Directed by Eric Schaeffer; September 5 – October 22, 2000
 In the Absence of Spring, by Joe Calarco. Directed by Joe Calarco; November 7 – December 17, 2000
 Gypsy, music by Jule Styne, lyrics by Stephen Sondheim, book by Arthur Laurents. Directed by Bayorke Lee; January 9 – February 25, 2001
 In the Garden, by Normal Allen. Directed by Joe Calarco; March 13 – April 2001
 Putting it Together, music and lyrics by Stephen Sondheim. Directed by Eric Schaeffer; May 22 – July 8, 2001

2001–2002 season 

 Grand Hotel, music and lyrics by Robert Wright, George Forrest & Maury Yeston, book by Luther Davis. Directed by Eric Schaeffer; August 21 – October 7, 2001
 Zander's Boat, by Grace Barnes. Directed by Grace Barnes; October 30 – December 9, 2001
 The Gospel According to Fishman, book and lyrics by Michael Lazar, music and lyrics by Richard Oberacker. Directed by Eric Schaeffer; January 8 – February 24, 2001
 Hedwig & The Angry Inch, by John Cameron Mitchell & Stephen Trask. Directed by Eric Schaeffer; March 19 – May 11, 2002
 The Diaries, by John Strand. Directed by P.J. Papernelli; June 4 – July 14, 2002
 The Rink – In Concert, music by John Kander, lyrics by Fred Ebb, book by Terrence McNally; June 19–23, 2002

2002–2003 season 

 What the Butler Saw, by Joe Orton. Directed by Jonathan Bernstein; September 3 – October 20, 2002
 The Christmas Carol Rag, by Norman Allen. Directed by Eric Schaeffer, November 12 – December 29, 2002
 110 in the Shade, music by Harvey Schmidt, lyrics by Tom Jones, book by N. Richard Nash. Directed by Eric Schaeffer; January 21 – March 9, 2003
 Follies, music and lyrics by Stephen Sondheim, book by James Goldman. Directed by Eric Schaeffer; April 1 – June 1, 2003
 Donna Q, by Paulette Laufer. Directed by Jose Carrasquillo; June 17 – July 17, 2003
 Mack and Mabel – In Concert, music and lyrics by Jerry Herman, book by Michael Stewart. Directed by Eric Schaeffer; June 18–22, 2003

2003–2004 season 

 Twentieth Century, by Ben Hecht & Charles MacArthur, adaptation by Ken Ludwig. Directed by Eric Schaeffer; August 19 – September 28, 2003
 A Funny Thing Happened on the Way to the Forum, music and lyrics by Stephen Sondheim, book by Larry Gelbart. Directed by Garry Griffin; October 28 – December 14, 2003
 Allegro, music by Richard Rodgers, book and lyrics by Oscar Hammerstein, book adaptation by Joe DiPietro. Directed by Eric Schaeffer
 Elegies: A Song Cycle, by William Finn. Directed by Joe Calarco; March 23 – May 9, 2004
 The Blue Room, by David Hare. Directed by Wendy Goldberg; June 1 – July 11, 2004

2004–2005 season 

 One Red Flower, by Paris Barclay. Directed by Eric Schaeffer; August 17 – October 3, 2004
 The Highest Yellow, music and lyrics by Michael John LaChuisa, book by John Strand; October 26 – December 12, 2004
 Fallen From Proust, by Norman Allen. Directed by Joe Calarco; January 11 – February, 2005
 The Unknowns, by Robin Baitz. Directed by rick DeRoches; March 15 – April, 2005
 Pacific Overtures, music and lyrics by Stephen Sondheim, book by John Weidman. Directed by Eric Schaeffer; May 17 – July 3, 2005

2005–2006 season 

 Urinetown, music and lyrics by Mark Hollman, book and lyrics by Greg Kotis. Directed by Joe Calarco; August 16 – October 16, 2005
 Yemaya's Belly, Quiara Alegria Hudes, directed by Rick DeRoches; November 8 – December 18, 2005
 Nevermore, music by Matt Conner, lyrics by Edgar Allan Poe, book by Grace Barnes. Directed by Eric Schaeffer; January 10 – February 26, 2006
 The Sex Habits of American Women, by Julie Marie Myatt. Directed by Michael Baron; March 28 – May 7, 2006
 Assassins, music and lyrics by Stephen Sondheim, book by John Weidman. Directed by Joe Calarco; May 30 – July 30, 2006

2006–2007 season 

 My Fair Lady, music by Frederick Loewe, book and lyrics by Alan Jay Lerner. Directed by Eric Schaeffer; September 26 – November 25, 2007
 Into the Woods, music and lyrics by Stephen Sondheim, book by James Lapine. Directed by Eric Schaeffer; January 11 – February 25, 2007
 Crave, by Sarah Kane. Directed by Jeremy Skidmore; January 30 – April 1, 2007
 Saving Aimee, music by David Pomeranz and David Freidman, book and lyrics by Kathie Lee Gifford. Directed by Eric Schaeffer; April 10 – May 13, 2007
 Nest, by Bathsheba Dolan. Directed by Joe Calarco; April 24 – June 24, 2007
 The Witches of Eastwick, music by Dana P. Rowe, book and lyrics by John Dempsey. Directed by Eric Schaeffer; June 5 – July 15, 2007

2007–2008 season 

 Merrily We Roll Along, music and lyrics by Stephen Sondheim, book by George Furth. Directed by Eric Schaeffer' September 4 – October 14, 2007
 The Word Begins, written and performed by Steve Connel and Sekou. Directed and developed by Robert Egan; October 2 – December 2, 2007
 The Studio, written, directed, and performed by Christopher D'Amboise; November 6 – December 9, 2007
 Glory Days, music and lyrics by Nick Blaemire, book by James Gardiner. Directed by Eric Schaeffer; January 15 – February 17, 2008
 Kiss of The Spider Woman, music by John Kander, lyrics by Fred Ebb, book by Terrence McNally. Directed by Eric Schaeffer; March 11 – April 20, 2008
 The Happy Time, music by John Kander, lyrics by Fred ebb, book by Richard Nash. Directed by Michael Unger; April 1 – June 1, 2008
 The Visit, music by John Kander, lyrics by Fred Ebb, book by Terrence McNally. Directed by Frank Galati; May 13 – June 22, 2008

2008–2009 season 

 Ace, book and music by Richard Oberacker, book and lyrics by Rob Taylor. Directed by Eric Schaeffer; August 27 – September 28, 2008
 Anyone Can Whistle – A Benefit Concert, music and lyrics by Stephen Sondheim, book by Arthur Laurents. Directed by Eric Schaeffer; October 6, 2008
 The Lieutenant of Inishmore, by Martin McDonagh. Directed by Jeremy Skidmore; September 23 – November 16, 2008
 Les Misérables, music by Claude-Michel Schonberg, lyrics by Herbert Kretzmer. Directed by Eric Schaeffer; December 2 – February 22, 2009
 The Little Dog Laughed, by Douglas Carter Beane. Directed by Michael Baron; January 13 – March 15, 2009
 See What I Wanna See, music, lyrics, and book by Michael John LaChuisa. Directed by Matthew Gardiner; April 7 – May 31, 2009
 Giant, music and lyrics by Michael John LaChuisa, book by Sybille Pearson. Directed by Johnathan Butterall; April 28 – May 31, 2009

2009–2010 season 

 First You Dream: The Music of Kander & Ebb, music by John Kander, lyrics by Fred Ebb. Directed by Eric Schaeffer; September 10-2009
 Dirty Blonde, by Claudia Sheer. Directed by Jeremy Skidmore; August 11 – October 4, 2009
 Show Boat, music by Jerome Kern, book and lyrics by Oscar Hammerstein. Directed by Eric Schaeffer; November 10 – January 17, 2010
 I Am My Own Wife, by Doug Wright. Directed by Alan Paul; January 12 – March 7, 2010
 Sweeney Todd, music and lyrics by Stephen Sondheim, book by Hugh Wheeler. Directed by Eric Schaeffer; February 9 – March 2010
[title of show], music and lyrics by Jeff Bowen, book by Hunter Bell. Directed by Matthew Gardiner; March 30 – June 20, 2010
 Sycamore Trees, book, music, and lyrics by Ricky Ian Gordon. Directed by Tina Landau; May 18 – June 20, 2010

2010–2011 season 

 Chess, music by Björn Ulvaeus & Benny Andersson, lyrics by Tim Rice, book by Richard Nelson. Directed by Eric Schaeffer; August 10 – September 26, 2010
 A Fox on the Fairway, by Ken Ludwig. Directed by John Rando; October 12 – November 14, 2010
 Walter Cronkite is dead, written and directed by Joe Calarco; October 26 – December 19, 2010
 Sunset Boulevard, music by Andrew Lloyd Webber, book and lyrics by Don Black & Christopher Hampton. Directed by Eric Schaeffer; December 7 – February 13, 2010
And the Curtain Rises, Music by Joseph Thalken, lyrics by Mark Campbell, book by Michael Slade. Directed by Eric Schaeffer; March 15 – April 10, 2011
Art, by Yasmina Reza, translated by Christopher Hampton. Directed by Matthew Gardiner; March 29 – May 22, 2011
Side by Side by Sondheim, music and lyrics by Stephen Sondheim. Directed by Eric Schaeffer; April 26 – June 12, 2011

2011–2012 season 

 The Hollow, music by Matt Conner, book by Hunter Foster. Directed by Matthew Gardiner; August 23 – October 16, 2011
 The Boy Detective Fails, music and lyrics by Adam Gown, book by Joe Meno. Directed by Joe Calarco; August 25 – October 16, 2011
 Saturday Night – A Concert, music and lyrics by Stephen Sondheim, book by Phillip Epstein; October 29–30, 2011
 A Second Chance, book, music, and lyrics by Ted Shen. Directed by Jonathan Butterel; November 15 – December 11, 2011
 Hairspray, music by Marc Shaiman, lyrics by March Shaiman and Scott Wittman, book by Thomas Meehan. Directed by Eric Schaeffer; November 21 – February 5, 2012
 Really Really, by Paul Downs Colaizzo. Directed by Matthew Gardiner; January 31 – March 24, 2012
 Brother Russia, music by Dana Rowe, book and lyrics by John Dempsey. Directed by Eric Schaeffer; March 6 – April 15, 2012
 God of Carnage, by Yasmina Reza, translated by Christopher Hampton. Directed by Joe Calarco; April 10 – June 24, 2012
 Xanadu, Music & Lyrics by Jeff Lynne & John Farrar, book by Douglas Carter Beane. Directed by Matthew Gardiner; May 8 – July 1, 2012

2012–2013 season 

 The Best Little Whorehouse in Texas, music and lyrics by Carol Hall, book by Larry King and Peter Masterson. Directed by Eric Schaeffer; August 14 – October 21, 2012
 Dying City, by Christopher Shinn. Directed by Matthew Gardiner; October 2 – November 25, 2012
 Dreamgirls, music by Henry Krieger, book and lyrics by Tom Eyen. Directed by Matthew Gardiner; November 13 – January 13, 2013
 Shakespeare's R&J, adapted and directed by Joe Calarco; February 5 – March 3, 2013
 Hello, Dolly!, music and lyrics by Jerry Herman, book by Michael Stewart. Directed by Eric Schaeffer; March 15 – May 18, 2013 (A Co-Production with Ford's Theatre)
 The Last Five Years, by Jason Robert Brown. Directed by Aaron Posner; April 2–28, 2013
 Company, music and lyrics by Stephen Sondheim, book by George Furth. Directed by Eric Schaeffer; May 21 – June 30, 2013

2013–2014 season 

 Miss Saigon, Music by Claude-Michel Schönberg, lyrics by Richard Maltby Jr. & Alain Boublil. Directed by Eric Schaeffer; August 16 – October 6, 2013
 Pride in the Falls of Autrey Mill, by Paul Downs Colaizzo. Directed by Michael Kahn; October 15 – December 8, 2013
 Crossing, music and lyrics by Matt Conner, book by Grace Barnes. Directed by Eric Schaeffer; October 29 – November 24, 2013
 Gypsy, music by Jule Sytne, lyrics by Stephen Sondheim, book by Arthur Laurents. Directed by Joe Calarco; December 17 – January 26, 2014
 Beaches, music by David Austen, lyrics by Iris Rainer Dart, book by Iris Rainer Dart & Thom Thomas. Directed By Eric Schaeffer; February 18 – March 29, 2014
 Tender Napalm, by Philip Ridley. Directed by Matthew Gardiner; March 18 – May 11, 2014
 The Threepenny Opera, music by Kurt Weil, book and lyrics by Bertolt Brecht. Directed by Matthew Gardiner; April 22 – June 1, 2014
 Cloak & Dagger, book, music, and lyrics by Ed Dixon. Directed by Eric Schaeffer; June 12 – July 6, 2014

2014–2015 season 

 Sunday in the Park with George, music and lyrics by Stephen Sondheim, book by James Lapine. Directed by Matthew Gardiner; August 5 – September 21, 2014
 Elmer Gantry, music by Mel Marvin, lyrics by Bob Satuloff, book by John Bishop. Directed by Eric Schaeffer; October 7 – November 9, 2014
 Sex with Strangers, by Laura Eason. Directed by Aaron Posner; October 14 – December 7, 2014
 Diner, music and lyrics by Sheryl Crow, book by Barry Levinson. Directed by Kathleen Marshall; December 9 – January 24, 2015
 Kid Victory, music by John Kander, book and lyrics by Greg Pierce. Directed by Liesl Tommy; February 17 – March 22, 2015
 Soon, book, music, and lyrics by Nick Blaemire. Directed by Matthew Gardiner; March 10 – April 26, 2015
 Simply Sondheim, music and lyrics by Stephen Sondheim, Co-conceived by David Loud & Eric Schaeffer, directed by Matthew Gardiner; April 2–19, 2015
 Cabaret, music by John Kander, lyrics by Fred Ebb, book by Joe Masteroff. Directed by Matthew Gardiner; May 12 – June 28, 2015

2015–2016 season 

 The Fix, music by Dana Rowe, book and lyrics by John P. Dempsey. Directed by Eric Schaeffer; August 11 – September 20, 2015
 Cake Off, music by Adam Gwon, lyrics by Adam Gwon & Julia Jordon, book by Sheri Wilner & Julia Jordan. Directed by Joe Calarco; September 19 – November 22, 2015
 Girlstar, Music by Brian Feinstein, book and Lyrics by Anton Dudley. Directed by Eric Scaheffer; October 14 – November 15, 2015
 West Side Story, music by Leonard Bernstein, lyrics by Stephen Sondheim, book by Arthurt Laurents. Directed by Matthew Gardiner, December 8 – January 31, 2016
 George: My Adventures with Georgie Rose, by Ed Dixon. Directed by Eric Schaeffer; January 8 – February 7, 2016
 Road Show, music and lyrics by Stephen Sondheim, book by John Weidman. Directed by Gary Griffin; February 16 – March 13, 2016
 The Flick, by Annie Baker. Directed by Joe Calarco; April 1–24, 2016
 The Mystery of Love and Sex, by Bathsheba Doran. Directed by Stella Powell Jones; April 5 – May 8, 2016
 La Cage Aux Folles, music and lyrics by Jerry Herman, book by Harvey Fierstein. Directed by Matthew Gardiner; May 31 – July 10, 2016

2016–2017 season 

 Jelly's Last Jam, Music by Jelly Roll Morton, lyrics by Susan Birkenhead, book by George C. Wolfe. Directed by Matthew Gardiner; August 2 – September 11, 2016
 The Gulf, by Audrey Cefaly. Directed by Joe Calarco; September 13 – November 6, 2016
 Freaky Friday, music by Tom Kitt, lyrics by Brian Yorkey, book by Bridget Carpenter. Directed by Christopher Ashley; October 4 – November 20, 2016
 Silver Belles, Music by Matt Conner, lyrics by Matt Conner and Stephen Gregory Smith, book by Allyson Currin. Directed by Eric Scaeffer; November 22 – December 31, 2016
 Titanic, music and by Maury Yeston, book by Peter Stone. Directed by Eric Scaheffer; December 13, 2016 – January 29, 2017
 Mrs. Miller Does Her Thing, by James Lapine; Directed by James Lapine. February 28 – March 26, 2017
 Midwestern Gothic, music by Josh Schmidt, lyrics by Royce Vavrek and Josh Schmidt, book by Royce Vavrek. Directed by Matthew Gardiner; March 14 – April 30, 2017
 Jesus Christ Superstar, music by Andrew Lloyd Webber, lyrics by Tim Rice. Directed by Joe Calarco; May 9 – July 9, 2017

2017–2018 season 

 A Little Night Music, music and lyrics by Stephen Sondheim, book by Hugh Wheeler. Directed by Eric Schaeffer; August 15 – October 15, 2017
 An Act of God, by David Javerbaum. Directed by Elanor Holdridge; October 3 – November 26, 2017
 Crazy For You, music by George Gerswhin, lyrics by Ira Gerswhin, book by Ken Ludwig. Directed by Matthew Gardiner; November 7, 2017 – January 14, 2018
 4,380 Nights, by Annalisa Dias. Directed byKathleen Akerley ; January 16 – February 18, 2018
 Light Years, book, music, and lyrics by Robbie Schaefer. Directed by Eric Schaeffer; February 6 – March 4, 2018
 John, by Annie Baker. Directed by Joe Calarco; April 3–29, 2018
 Girlfriend, music and lyrics by Matthew Sweet, book by Todd Almond. Directed by Matthew Gardiner; April 17 – June 17, 2018
 The Scottsboro Boys, music by John Kander, lyrics by Fred Ebb, book by David Thompson. Directed by Joe Calarco; May 22 – July 1, 2018

2018–2019 season 

 Passion, music and lyrics by Stephen Sondheim, book by James Lapine. Directed by Matthew Gardiner;
 Heisenberg, by Simon Stephens. Directed by Joe Calarco; September 18 – November 11, 2018
 Billy Elliot, music by Elton John, book and lyrics by Lee Hall, directed by Matthew Gardiner; October 30, 2018 – January 6, 2019
 [[Ain't Misbehavin' (musical)|Ain't Misbehavin''']], Music by Fats Waller, conceived by, Richard Maltby, Jr. & Murray Horwitz. Directed by Joe Calarco; January 23 – March 10, 2019
 Masterpieces of the Oral and Intangible Heritage of Humanity, by Heather MacDonald. Directed by Nadia Tass; February 26 – April 7, 2019
 Grand Hotel, music and lyrics by Robert Wright and George Forrest & Maury Yeston, book by Luther Davis. Directed by Eric Schaeffer; April 2 – May 19, 2019
 Spunk, by Zora Neale Hurston, adapted by George C. Wolfe. Directed by Timothy Douglas; April 30 – June 23, 2019
 Blackbeard, music by Dana Rowe, lyrics by John P. Dempsey. Directed by Eric Schaeffer; June 18 – July 14, 2019

 2019–2020 season 

 Assassins, music and lyrics by Stephen Sondheim, book by John Weidman. Directed by Eric Schaeffer; August 11 – September 29, 2019
 Escaped Alone, by Caryl Churchill. Directed by Holly Twyford; September 24 – November 3, 2019
 A Chorus Line, music by Marvin Hamlisch, lyrics by Edward Kleban, book by James Kirkwood & Nicholas Dante. Directed by Matthew Gardiner; October 29, 2019 – January 5, 2020
 Gun & Powder, music by Ross Baum, book and lyrics by Angelica Chéri. Directed by Robert O'Hara; January 28 – February 23, 2020
 Easy Women Smoking Loose Cigarettes, by Dani Stoller. Directed by Stevie Zimmerman;
 Camille Claudel, music by Frank Wildhorn, book and lyrics by Nan Knighton. Directed by Eric Schaeffer; March 24 – April 19, 2020
 Nijinsky's Last Dance, by Norman Allen. Directed by Joe Calarco; April 14 – May 24, 2020
 Hair, music by Galt MacDermot, book and lyrics by Gerome Ragni & James Rado. Directed by Matthew Gardiner; May 19 – July 12, 2020

Awards

 2009 – Regional Theatre Tony Award

431 Helen Hayes Nominations with 107 Awards (as of 2019) including the following

 2015 Outstanding Resident Musical – Sunday in the Park With George 2014 Outstanding Resident Musical – Hello, Dolly! 2013 Outstanding Resident Musical – Dreamgirls 2013 Charles MacArthur Award – Paul Downs Colaizzo for Really Really 2011 Outstanding Resident Musical – Hairspray 
 2009 Outstanding Resident Musical – Les Misérables.
 2006 Outstanding Resident Musical – Urinetown.
 2005 Outstanding Resident Musical – Allegro.
 2001 Outstanding Resident Musical – Side Show.
 1999 Outstanding Resident Play    – Nijinsky's Last Dance.
 1997 Outstanding Resident Musical – Passion.
 1995 Outstanding Resident Musical – Into the Woods.
 1993 Outstanding Resident Musical – Assassins.
 1992 Outstanding Resident Musical – Sweeney Todd.

Programs and memberships
The Signature Theatre offers a number of programs to both writers and performing artists, and to the community..

 Signature in the Schools is a program designed for Arlington County high school students, culminating in an annual all-student production.
 Overtures, a two-week musical theater intensive course for performers age 18 and older, is held to encourage young musical theatre performers in the area. A separate, 'pre-Overtures' program (for ages 14–17) exists for younger students, called "Stage One".
 "Signature Conservatory," an innovative program for advanced high school actors, began in fall 2018. 
 The Cabaret'' series features professional cabaret singers from Washington and New York City.

Signature Theatre is a member of League of Resident Theatres (LORT) using the League administered collective bargaining agreements with Actors' Equity Association (AEA), the Stage Directors and Choreographers Society (SDC), and United Scenic Artists (USA).

Signature Theatre is a member of the League of Washington Theaters (LOWT).

See also

Helen Hayes Award
Theater in Washington, D.C.

References

External links
Official website
arlingtonunwired article, date unknown

1989 establishments in Virginia
League of Resident Theatres
Theatres in Virginia
Members of the Cultural Alliance of Greater Washington
League of Washington Theatres
Tony Award winners
Regional theatre in the United States
Signature Theatre
Theatres completed in 1989